Chapa is a feminine given name. Notable people with the name include:

 Chapa Herrera (born 1996), American soccer player
 Linda Chapa LaVia (born 1966), American politician
 Nora Chapa Mendoza (born 1932), American artist

See also

Chara (given name)

Feminine given names